The Royal Almanac is a French administrative directory founded in 1683 by the bookseller Laurent d'Houry, which appeared under this title from 1700 to 1792, and under other titles until 1919.

He presented each year in the official order of precedence, the list of members of the royal family of France, the princes of blood, and the main body of the kingdom, great crown officers, senior clerics, abbots of large abbeys (with income of each abbey), marshals of France, colonels and general officers, ambassadors and consuls of France, presidents of the main courts, state councilors, bankers, etc..

Despite the fact that it could appear indigestible because of the many lists that it contained, the publication enjoyed a wide circulation with a readership consisting primarily of financiers, politicians, and all persons who had an interest in knowing the administrative organization of France.

Although his edition is due to the initiative of a private publisher, included in the lists of the Almanac was a royal official and abuse were therefore punished. Thus, a Poitevin, Pierre Joly, was interned in the Bastille at the end of the eighteenth century to have usurped the banking profession by being registered as such in the Almanach Royal.

His edition was in regular format in-8 o editor with a binder leather adorned with a sprinkling of fleur de lys gold.

History

Founded at the request of King
Laurent d'Houry imagines a calendar or Almanac 1683. The first edition contained only a few pages with a calendar and omens for the coming year. The last edition in this form, in 1699, already shows some lists that foreshadow the upcoming Royal Almanac. Thus we find lists of counselors of state with their ordinary homes, the commissioners of the Board, auditors general and stewards of finances, the Chancellor, archbishops and bishops of France, universities, and the list of major exhibitions, sessions of the courts of Paris and the log of the Palace, and finally addresses the messengers and items indicating the day of departure.

In 1699, Louis XIV asked him what the author describes in detail his work. Here as his widow explains these beginnings :

"Louis XIV, who wanted this glorious memory Almanac, made him ask the author, who had the honor to present to Her Majesty's what induced him to give the title of Royal Almanac, & to make it his principal occupation of this work. "

The same year Louis Tribouillet, chaplain of the king and canon of Meaux, publishes its State of France. This book describes in detail the functioning of the Court of the King, all his ministers, the treatments they receive, the various expenses of the state, clergy, etc..

The first edition of the Almanac Royal appears in 1700, at the same time as another book, Calendar of the Court of John Colombat, one of the printers of the King. Parisians have a choice between three books with similar content: the Almanach Royal Houry, Calendar of the Court of Colombat and the State of France Tribouillet. At that time, the yard around Louis XIV is highly stratified and since the expansion of the Palace of Versailles in 1684, it continues to grow. In this context, recognition of peers is a valuable asset "if someone has just placed a new post is an overflow of praise in its favor during the floods and the Chapel (...) but c is that while envy and jealousy talk like adulation.. One can understand the need to maintain directories so that everyone can follow the evolution of all these people. The multiplicity of these publications so says the king's will want to "officially" referencing his courtiers to charges created to keep beside him at Versailles, and maintain the jealousies of each other.

Even if the king gave his approval, publishing such a book is not without risk. In December 1708, Laurent d'Houry is being prosecuted for having established a printing press in his house and forced to sell its equipment two months later. Then, in February 1716, he was imprisoned in the Bastille on complaint of the Earl of Stair, the British Ambassador, "to be disrespectful in his almanac, the King George by not naming him not as king of England, or rather from Great Britain, and mention the king as son of Jacques II Stuart, exiled to St. Germain.

Affirmation of a monopoly
The Almanac and the Royal Court Calendar coexist peacefully for ten years and a lot of money to their authors, but from 1710, Laurent d'Houry integrates more and more topics like the book Colombat Biblio. The abscess broke out in 1717 when Houry Almanac releases its Abstract that will follow the format of the Calendar of the Court and simultaneously filing a lawsuit against its competitor. A Judgement of Solomon is made: if it is allowed to Houry now to continue the publication of its abstract and to counterfeit the Court Calendar, Colombat is obliged to freeze its calendar format and forbidden 'expand content. This stops any changes in the calendar of the Court, leaving the way open to the Almanac.

Upon the death of Laurent Houry in 1725, his family is destitute. Revenues from sales of the Almanac are not sufficient to cover expenses of printing and bookselling. In these circumstances, his widow, Elizabeth Dubois, took over the business. Their son Charles-Maurice, who had hitherto been a mere proofreader of the Almanac, is trying to evict her mother and she is suing cons. It prepares the edition of 1726 but a ruling forbade him to publish it in his name alone. The ruling of 11 December 1726 forbids even disturb the affairs of his mother and to participate directly or indirectly to the development of the Almanac. That is why Charles-Maurice is mentioned as editor of the Almanac on the edition of 1726.

In 1731, she filed a new lawsuit against Colombat which increased its schedule despite the prohibition of 1717. Unsuccessful, she resumed the publication of the Abstract and Colombat complaint in turn, she then accepts to abandon the publication of the Abstract "if returned to Colombat format from 1718. "The disputes have become extinct with the death of the parties.

The privilege of the Almanac is about to expire, Charles-Maurice d'Houry tries one last time to seize it, but a royal letter of 27 March 1744 confirmed definitively André-François Le Breton as sole heir.

A family of hegemony 131 years

Directorate of André Le Breton
In 1728, the widow of his grandson, Houry combines son André-François Le Breton, who was 18 years old and an orphan under the guardianship of Charles-Maurice d'Houry. Andrew Francis had inherited, according to the will of the estate of Lawrence Houry, half of the rights of the Almanac, and his widow, the rest.

Under his leadership, the Almanac takes a new breath and adds new sections, which sometimes does not go without punishment. For example, in 1768, he has trouble with Voltaire, who sent him a letter incendiary:

"I say as much to Le Breton, the Almanach royal printer: I'll pay him Almanac point that sold me this year. He had the rudeness to say that Mr. President... Mr. advisor..., remains in the cul-de-sac to Menard, in the cul-de-sac of the White Coats in the ass -de-sac de l'Orangerie. (...) How can you say that president remains in a serious ass?"

In 1773, Le Breton moved his print shop in a wing of the former Hotel d'Alegre, at 13 rue de Hautefeuille, he acquired William Louis Joly de Fleury and was previously occupied by Ambassador Portugal.

In the late eighteenth century, the weather is bad and bad wheat harvests. The price of this staple increases disproportionately. Recently, a rumor that the government would have the monopoly wheat, thus perpetuating the high cost of food. This rumor became official when accidentally in his edition of 1774, Le Breton added a "Treasurer's grain account of the King" in the person of Sr. Mirlavaud. The edition of the Almanac had yet been proofread and approved by the Chancellor, but was still sentenced to close his shop for 3 months and publish a revised edition, without the line in question,.

In 1777, Le Breton was again accused of inserting information deemed subversive. It has, according to its critics, cited "the Floral & Pranks Vergès & Vaucresson, among the prosecutors and attorneys general of the Parliament of Paris, who had been involved in a reform of parliament made by Maupeou against the venality of Parliament desired by Louis XV, but annulled by Louis XVI. In rebuke, Le Breton was sentenced to " carton "section on the Almanacs that had not yet been sold, and replacement cost, the Almanac issue of those who so request it."

He died on 4 October 1779 and his cousin, Charles-Laurent Houry, son of Charles-Maurice d'Houry, took over the business.

French Revolution
The privilege granted to the family of Houry for the Almanac has been threatened in 1789 when Camille Desmoulins, in his speech at the Lantern to the Parisians, says it will cease in favor of Baldwin, another Parisian publisher. This threat has not been brought into effect since the Almanac remained in Houry. Looking at the publications of the time, we can nevertheless see that Baldwin got the impressions of the National Assembly and other organs of state.

Last generation Houry
Following the death of Joan Nera, widow of Laurent-Charles Houry, the Almanac is echoed by Jean-François-Noël Debure, husband of Anne-Charlotte d'Houry, their daughter. Debure is from a prominent and wealthy family of Parisian booksellers, especially combined with the Didot family. It is a printer since 1784 with the title's printer Duke of Orleans.

Debure takes time printing of the family of Houry, but his other business is in trouble and he is forced to file for bankruptcy. To keep the property inherited from his family, Anne-Charlotte d'Houry hires a separation procedure. In November 1791, the bankruptcy is declared and it is opposed to the creditors to preserve his legacy, and this opposition is futile and a ruling allows creditors to seize his furniture, but that does not appear to have been necessary because a subsequent decision allows him to recover property that creditors have not taken her husband.

Francois-Jean-Noel Debure dies 1802 in Loiret. However, it is focused died from 1795 through various sources. Maybe it was just left without leaving an address.

Stephen Lawrence Testu worked as a clerk in the family home Debure since 1788, and had gradually won the confidence of the household. Because of the absence of Mr. Debure, Anne-Charlotte is alone with his two son. Despite their age difference, he is 20 years younger than she, she married Testu July 1795. Testu few highlights its knowledge in the profession to convince him to transfer the management of printing. It accepts in 1797 and offered him priority over the rights of the Almanac in exchange for a perpetual annuity of 800 francs, then she completely abandons the Almanac. This influx of money seems to turn the head Testu who play games and learn to enjoy the easy life, neglects the direction of its establishment and constantly running out of money, he contracted many loans that gradually ruining his business. Relations were strained with his wife because he left the marital home in September 1801 and the only ties that bind the couple are now linked to multiple trials they s'intentent.

In 1810, Testu secretly sold the rights of the Almanac in which he partnered with Guyot. Anne-Charlotte d'Houry opposes this sale she saw as a usurpation, but loses the case in 1812. She gets in return a pension of 1 200 francs Testu does not pay. Indeed, a decree of 1820 declares the debtor more than 90 000 francs... In 1814, due to the large sums invested by Guyot in the case, an order confirming the owner of the Almanac, a copy of this order is also printed at the end of the following books. Testu still gets Guyot repayment of its debts and an annuity of 2,400 francs.

Guyot dismisses Testu business in 1820 and continues even to pay his annuity. The latter, again running out of money turned in 1823 against his wife, calls it reaches the marital home and she pays all household expenses, or alternatively, that she pays rent of 6000 francs. Judges déboutent Testu the marital home, since he himself had deserted 22 years earlier and has no housing to offer his wife even though she already lives in a very beautiful but still require his wife, yet very rich, to pay him a pension of 1,800 francs by invoking the solidarity between spouses.

The hegemony of the family of Houry on the Almanac established in 1683 has finally ceased in 1814 when, by order, the company is transferred to the association Guyot-Testu. Anne-Charlotte d'Houry died 22 July 1828 aged about 83 years.

Judgement of publishing
In 1867, edition of the Almanac is transferred to the widow Berger-Levrault, who had already published the Yearbook of the French empire diplomatic, and military Yearbook of the French empire, both published as the Almanac according to documents provided by the administration.

The edition of the Almanac stops definitively in 1919 after four years of interruption due to war, the latter number includes the years 1915 to 1919. Not found in the literature the reasons that prompted the shutdown of publication, but it can be assumed that the combination of very large volume of the book (more than 1650 pages in 1900) and the hard times that the Economics and French policy at that time was to make the management of such a volume of information extremely complex and unprofitable for the publisher. It is also possible that the new government formed after elections in 1919 no longer supported the development of the Almanac.

Changing content

The topics in the Almanac
The Almanac or Calendar, as he was called in its early editions, was just a simple calendar which were associated topics on astronomical events, the days of fairs, the newspaper of the Palace, the residence of messengers The departure of the mails, the price of currencies and the list of collectors' offices. After his presentation to the king in 1699, many items are constantly being added including the clergy, the royal family of France, then the families of other sovereign nations, officers, ambassadors, etc..

In 1705, Houry added to the list of knights of the Holy Spirit and peer and marshal of France. In 1707, it is the state of the clergy and, in 1712, the birth of kings, princes and princesses of Europe. After the death of Louis XIV, the Duke of Orleans, became the Regent, is added to the list of members of the royal family of the members of the House of Orleans. Later, he put more of his own, the full house of the Queen and princes.

It is not possible to describe all items contained in an almanac as there, so the contents of 1780 covers ten pages:

The Almanac also stands abreast of scientific advances. In the middle of the eighteenth century, improving the accuracy of clocks and many wealthy fans begin to observe and study the stars. It is indispensable to know precisely the difference between true solar time of sundials, and mean solar time clocks, especially since the advent of clocks seconds. This is the equation of the pendulum, also called the equation of time, the table is added shortly before 1750.

With the French Revolution, the Almanac exchange of title and its content is modified to match the new institutions.

The abolition of all distinctions requires overhaul the topics, timing of the vulgar era is replaced by the Republican calendar, the place reserved for kings and princes of Europe is replaced by a note on the friendly powers of France, the administrative organs of royal power are replaced by new ministries.

The content changes again with the reforms of the Consulate and the Empire, the Restoration, the Hundred Days, the July Monarchy, the Second Republic followed the Second Empire and the Third Republic who sees the end of the edition of Almanac. In each case, the bindings are supplied with the times.

As the number of entries is increasing, the number of pages follows the same trend: they numbered one hundred in 1699, nearly five-hundred in 1760, and seven-hundred just before the French Revolution. The course of a thousand pages is taken in 1840 to over 1000-6-cents in 1900. On average, about thirty names are listed per page, the total number of people or places listed annually in the tens of thousands, but no table patronymic does quickly find a particular name.

All changes in the Almanac makes it a very useful book for historians that may follow, year after year, ministries and other administrative bodies, movements of people in these offices, and retail organization public services to a resident of Paris (such as places of mailboxes, timetables and fares for ticks and royal messengers ).

Chronology of the 237 years of publishing Almanacs
After the death of Laurent Houry, his descendants continued his work until 1814. The edition was continued until 1919. It would be tedious to describe in words the evolution of the Almanac of the 237 years that have elapsed since the first edition by Laurent d'Houry in 1683, hence the choice of this table layout.

Throughout its existence, the Almanac has crossed 11 schemes political editor changed the title 14 times and 9 times.

Publication

Collecting information
Since its inception in 1700, following a royal demand, the Almanac invented by Laurent d'Houry aims to be an official handbook.

Until the French Revolution, contributors are cordially invited to provide information to the bookseller, as pointed note of the printer in the first pages of the Almanac. In 1771, for example, we read in the Journal History of the Revolution that the Bar Association in the person of a certain Gerbier, asserted that "there would be no change in the order of the table, and that it would be printed in the Almanac as Royal was last year, leaving out only the dead."

With the French Revolution, the order was given to government to provide all information to the publisher. In 1802, Testu gets even exclusivity.

Later, the collection of information for the Almanac is even part of the operating budget of the ministries and can be seen in order of December 31, 1844 signed by Louis-Philippe I "on the organization of the Ministry Administration Navy "Article 6 of which list the items in the budget" the formation of the Royal Almanac.

Typography
The print quality improves significantly when Laurent d'Houry became printer. It multiplies the bands and tail-lights to decorate and titles for sections. The Almanac is still very poor prints because the image is not its goal. Only that the reader can find are patterns explaining the oppositions of the planets and eclipses are present every year, and the map of departments of France editions of 1791 and 1792.

Despite the short time to prepare the book, the printer treats the presentation and uses in the case of many variations in size and shape of characters for easy reading of long lists, special characters to emphasize certain lines, compositions tables or columns and clusters in braces.

That Le Breton, grand son of Laurent Houry, who brings more to the book. It increases greatly and restructures the Almanac, and also improves its presentation in order to preserve readability. Many notes are added to guide the reader and help in understanding the operation of certain administrative bodies.

The Almanacs modern nineteenth-century advantage of technological advances. Cartoon characters are modernized and the use of fonts to graphics customizable multiplies, sometimes to excess: we can count at least 7 in 11 fonts fonts differ on the cover page of the National Almanac 1850 printed by Guyot et Scribe!

Announcements, the ancestors of advertising, are introduced by the publisher Berger-Levrault in the late nineteenth century.

Well-to-shoot
The deadline for submitting this information to the editor is set to "first ten days of October (or November). The last-minute changes are incorporated in an erratum end of the book. When they are too large, they may even delay the release. In late December, an event is sent to the administration for approving the content. This approval is required before the sale.

It leaves only two months to integrate the information of the year in the text of the previous edition and call all of the pages before submitting the book for the right to shoot. The editing step, at least for the test in 1706, has not been done with great care as can be seen by very many shells and mistakes which have crept into the table of contents presented in thumbnail to the right.

Once the administrative agreement obtained, it is inserted end of the book, the Almanac is stapled or bound and is then distributed to customers at the end of the year.

Printing
Early Almanacs were not printed by Laurent d'Houry. The Almanac of 1706 and is printed by Jacques Vincent, installed Huchette street, at the sign of the Angel. November 15, 1712, Laurent Houry became printer and immediately began printing his work. Then all the almanacs will be printed by their publishers.

Draw
There is no source that explains the draw of the Almanac. The only figures available are the annual rents generated by sales.

In 1782, Mercier said a pension of more than 40 000 francs. Diderot, at the same time, puts the figure at 30,000 pounds. For a price of sale of 5 to 6 pounds, the draw must necessarily be greater than about 7500 almanacs.

Around 1820, during the trials that have brought the widow and Debure Testu, income of the Almanac was estimated between 25 and 30 000 francs. In 1834, another almanac, the Almanac of France, said that its cost is 35 cents for a sale price of 50 cents. Booksellers then purchase the item at prices of 38 cents, to resell a suggested retail price of 50 cents. The publisher earns so 3 cents per pound sold, the bookseller earns 12 (minus shipping costs, dependent). If one considers - arbitrarily - a four Almanac is sold directly into the library Testu (priced at 10 francs 50) the remainder being passed through intermediaries, we can prorate that to generate an annual income of 30 000 francs Testu must sell approximately 25 000.

In the absence of more precise information, we can only estimate at about 15,000, the number of copies sold per year between the late eighteenth and early nineteenth century.

Binding
The almanac is sold either stapled or bound by the printer. The paperback version allows the purchaser to connect his book as he wishes, and so it is possible to find books with bindings very ornate, with lace, coats of arms of families, many colors brightened or gilding Biblio 24, etc..

The bound version provided by the printer is usually presented in a bound in calf or Morocco, full, and lilies in the boxes back. With the revolution, the lilies are replaced with Phrygian caps in roundels Library 25.

Distribution
The Almanac is normally available from the bookseller, but it can also be found in the province in other bookstores that serve as intermediaries, for example in 1816, at Pesche, bookseller at Le Mans Ref 17, or by correspondence through the Sorbonne, as did Voltaire Ref 18.

Readership
The Almanac has a very great interest because of the number of subjects it addresses the organization of the French administration. In 1785, Mairobert wrote that "the Almanach Royal is in the hands of everyone and is among the Princes, the King's office, the foreign ministers would cater Ref 19. Louis-Sebastien Mercier in a pamphlet, the Tableau de Paris that stands in 1782 Ref 20 explains that "Those who are thrown into the paths of ambition, study Almanac Royal with serious attention," "more a beautiful royal consult the almanac to see if her lover is a lieutenant or sergeant,... ", that" everyone is buying the almanac to find out exactly where they stand. "And finally" even Fontenelle said, that it was the book which contained the greatest truths."

Adages use the almanac as a reference. According to Jean-François de La Harpe is "the only book to read to get rich is the Royal Almanac Ref 21, Jean-Joseph Regnault-Warin uses the phrase" having the memory of a Royal Almanac Ref 22 " or the Memoirs of the Academy of hawkers Ref 23 explains that "it is enough to read the Almanac for education."

In the eyes of justice, the book can be used as a basis for comparison: during a police investigation in 1824 Ref 24, a defendant defends himself by explaining that the volume of documents he was accused of having carried "could be equal to that of a royal Almanac almanac or a related trade."

Whether to have a certain level of resources to purchase this item, the customer extended beyond the financial and political world.

Competition
The Royal Almanac is competing at its inception with the Almanac of the Court of Colombat who can not make it evolve since 1717. In fact, bibliographers consider that the Royal Almanac is one of the "oldest and most helpful Ref 25". If it essentially describes the royal court and the Parisian institutions, other major cities also have their almanacs, such as the city of Lyon equally voluminous Ref 26. The Almanac is however considered a reference book. In 1780, a notice of a bookseller named Desnos inserted at the end of the Gazette of 27 offers for courts Ref 8 pounds to "the statesman, letters, and generally all persons attached to the service of the King (... ) Almanach Royal, Calendar of the Court, said Colombat, Mignone Strennas-Note 22, Ref 28, the State Military Note 23, the four connected units, with shelves & stylus to write, which makes the closure ": the Royal Almanac ranks first in the collection.

The Court Calendar
Since 1717, the Calendar of the Court can not change, its sections are limited to an ephemeris of the celestial motions (30 years) increased by astronomical tables with sky conditions, and timing of the court to the family and royal house, lists of boards, departments and secretaries of state finances, births and deaths of kings, queens, princes and princesses of Europe, the knights of various orders, the archbishops and bishops of the kingdom and Cardinals of the Sacred College.

It is primarily sought for its ephemeris of the celestial motions and astronomical tables of events

The Almanac of Commerce
The Almanac of Business, published by Sébastien Bottin in the eighteenth century contains, besides the addresses of shops in Paris, many useful statistics financiers. It is supplementary to the Almanach royal, which concerns only the French administration.

The State of France
Some have criticized the Almanach Royal of being a plagiarism of the State of France, another administrative directory, the first publication seems to have been made in 1619 and is still published in the middle of the eighteenth century Ref 30. However, the edition of 1736 of the State of France said it was a "periodical whose audience has applied for renewal from time to time, and had been published until 1699, 1702, 1708, 1712, 1718 and 1727 Ref 31. The latest editions of 1727 and 1736 five volumes contain over 500 pages each. Offices are described down to the smallest detail Note 25, the state of France is a companion volume of the Almanach royal use by those who wish to deepen their knowledge on the functioning of the French administration.

Examples of information contained in the Almanac
Further details concerning the organization of the administration of the French state, and persons who occupied positions, many other topics are discussed in the Almanacs, for example in the eighteenth century:

The cost of construction in Paris
This section is only found in the Almanacs of the early eighteenth century, and stops just before 1726.

There are prices for masonry, carpentry and joinery, roofing, locksmithing, painting and glazing that are usually in Paris, for example:

"Walls of circular pits, with layers of stone studded with low excess moilon quilted 18 inch thick, 22 pounds fquare fathom, and more in proportion to the depth of the wells, or other difficulties that may encounter."

With these data, the historian is able to quantify fully the construction of a building in Paris at that time.

The official ceremonies
The Almanac explains in great detail some official ceremonies:
 Opening Ceremony of the Annual Courthouse
"The Entry of Parliament is the day after the S. Martin, 12 November, which day Presidents in red dresses holding their furs & Mortar Note 26, & Gowns Gentlemen Consultants red, after attending the solemn Mass that are usually said by a Bishop in the grand hall of the Palace, receive oaths of Lawyers & Counsel. The first president made this day a speech to thank those who celebrated the Mass, which responds to him by another harangue Note 27."
 Procession of the University, whose description takes three pages of the Almanac Note 28
"The Rector of the University at the end of its Rector, who regularly is only three months, indicating a general procession which assists the whole body. It is a ceremony that deserves to be seen. We will mark the place here What the doctors take the four faculties Note 29 that comprise the university, all the graduates of these faculties, with the Religious Orders Note 30. Procession from the Church of Religious Trinitarians, otherwise known as Maturin. (...) The procession is closed by the booksellers, papermakers, bookbinders, Parcherminiers, illuminators, writers swear by the University."

The detailed description of the ceremonies to stop mid-eighteenth century to make room for a still more comprehensive directory. A reference is then made towards the end of the book "guides for all kinds of ceremonies to be observed in the receipt of any office or employment whether in dress or in the Sword."

Transportation
Transportation of persons is ensured by the coaches, carriages, wagons and other carriages. Found in the Almanac schedules and rates of major roads.

In 1715, a passenger wishing to travel from Paris to Caen will go rue Saint-Denis on Monday at six o'clock in the morning. He has previously "sent his clothes the night before early." Fifteen years later, the starting time is advanced to 5 am in summer and in 1750, the departure is 5 hours throughout the year. In 1780, two flights are scheduled Tuesdays and Fridays at 23:30 and the journey takes two days. A van, slower, except Sunday at noon and made the trip in four and a half days in summer and five days in winter. In 1790, transportation is now provided by the General Department of stagecoaches and mail royal France. Three coaches liaise on Tuesday, Thursday and Sunday and the van on Sunday. The departure is now Notre-Dame-des-Victoires.

Rates are rarely reported but in 1725 and 1761 is 18 pounds per person tournaments. He is 21 pounds in 1770 to reach 42 pounds in 1790 (fortunately for the traveler, it is stated that the "sleeping bag weighing 10 pounds is" free").

Company guards of the King Pumps
In 1716, the king appoints François Perrier Dumouriez as Director General of public pump to remedy fire, without the audience is obliged to pay anything. In 1722, he founded the Compagnie des Gardes Pumps du Roy, under the direction of the same. This company later became the Brigade of firefighters in Paris Note 32.

The Almanac of 1719 lists these pumps and their wardens and deputy wardens. We then learned that a brigade is made up of four guards and four sub-custodians who are responsible for maintaining the material deposited in each district. What became three years later the Society of King's Guards Pumps were not at that time that 41 people, 17 pumps distributed in groups of 8 men and 4 or 3 pumps in the City Hall, the convent of the Grands Augustins The Carmelite convent in the Place Maubert, Convent of Mercy, and the Fathers of Little Place des Victoires, in addition to a pump at the Director General of the pumps, Rue Mazarine. Except Dumouriez guards pumps are not professional fire but shoemakers, carpenters, locksmiths, etc..

Considerations bibliophiles

Availability
Almanacs are found regularly in auctions and in the antiquarian booksellers. Given their importance documentary and the fact that there are beautiful copies, these books are particularly sought after by historians, writers, bibliophiles and enthusiasts.

Volumes in the first round of the seventeenth century often exceed several thousand euros Ref 32, the other is generally negotiated between a few tens and five hundred euros, sometimes more, depending on their rarity, condition and quality bookbinding Note 33. Just over half are however available for free download on Gallica or Google Books:

Notes handwritten readers
Almanacs contain some handwritten notes left by their readers. The value of the book can then be influenced upward or downward depending on the quality and content of these notes, and especially the person who wrote them - when you can identify it. They are usually found on page intentionally left blank for the ephemeris. Some of these notes can provide very interesting information, such as notes written on the page in August 1715 a copy of the BNF. It relates the circumstances of the death of Louis XIV, who was suffering from gangrene Note 34:

"We thought the death dez Roy Lundy 25. He marched
better a day or two quoyque hopeless. It
died after having suffered much and with great
Patience on Sunday September 1, r t is 8 pm Morning
M r le Duc d'Orleans went to Parl t and was declared
Regent on 2. September e"

References

Historiography of France
18th-century books
Directories